Athletics was one of the sports at the Spartakiad of the Peoples of the USSR, and featured on the programme at all ten editions of the competition from 1956 to 1991. The competition was incorporated into the annual Soviet Athletics Championships in 1963, 1967, 1971, 1975, 1979, 1983 and 1991. The 1986 edition was not incorporated into the senior national championship as the Spartakiad imposed an upper age limit of 23 years for competitors that year. The results of the 1986 men's 10,000 metres were excluded from the Spartakiad rankings due to the slow finishing times achieved in the 30 degree heat.

The team competitions were generally staged between the Republics of the Soviet Union plus separate teams for Moscow and Leningrad, although foreign athletes competed in 1979 and 1983, and the team competition was abolished for the final edition.

Editions

The marathon events were twice staged outside the main track and field meeting – 14 May in 1983 and on 21 April in Bila Tserkva in 1991.

References

Editions
Лёгкая атлетика. Справочник / Составитель Р. В. Орлов. — М.: «Физкультура и спорт», 1983. — 392 с. 

 
Spartakiad
Spartakiad
Spartakiad
Spartakiad
Athletics